Hope Dawn is a historic home located near Lynchburg, Bedford County, Virginia. It was built about 1827, and is a -story, brick Federal-style farmhouse.  It consists of a three bay main block and one bay south wing. The walls are laid in Flemish bond with scattered glazed headers and penciled joints. It has a standing seam metal gable roof. Also on the property are a contributing old stone and brick stable that has been remodeled into a guesthouse, a simple stone structure that served variously as a distillery and a chicken house, and a frame office.

It was listed on the National Register of Historic Places in 1974.

References

Houses on the National Register of Historic Places in Virginia
Federal architecture in Virginia
Houses completed in 1827
Houses in Bedford County, Virginia
National Register of Historic Places in Bedford County, Virginia
1827 establishments in Virginia